Egil Kapstad (6 August 1940 – 13 July 2017) was a Norwegian jazz pianist, composer and arranger. He wrote the music for more than 50 theatre productions, and composed for film and television drama. Kapstad composed classical works for orchestra, choir, string quartet, and smaller ensembles, and was a chief executive of the association Ny Musikk. He worked as a host in television for NRK. Egil Kapstad's Trio worked as a small orchestra in the Norwegian Melodi Grand Prix of 1965.

Career
Kapstad was born in Oslo, Norway. He taught jazz history and improvisation at the Musikkonservatoriet i Kristiansand and performed as a pianist on more than 60 albums. Kapstad worked with jazz musician such as Karin Krog, Chet Baker, Red Mitchell, Bjørn Johansen, Bjarne Nerem, Jon Larsen and Magni Wentzel, being also known for his longstanding collaboration with poet Jan Erik Vold.

Kapstad received many awards and honors. He received Norsk jazzforbund's Buddyprisen in 1977, NOPA's award for the work of the year, (Epilog) in 1984, Gammleng-prisen in the class jazz in 1985 and was awarded Spellemannprisen in the class jazz twice, for the record Cherokee at the 1989 award of Spellemannprisen and Remembrance with the Egil Kapstad Trio at the 1994 award of Spellemannprisen.

Kapstad became a government scholar in 2003. He died in Kristiansand during July 2017.

Compositions (selected)
Syner (1967), performed in the new version 1990
Epilog – Bill Evans in Memoriam (Vossajazz, 1983)
Døgn for kammerorkester
Theater music for Shakespeare's King Lear
Theater music for Ibsen's Kongsemnerne
Theater music for Helge Hagerup's Kuler i solnedgangen

Discography

As leader/co-leader

As sideman
By Myself (1964), with Karin Krog
Twostep og blå ballader (1974), with Lars Klevstrand
I fløyterens hjerte (1990), with Lars Klevstrand
I anstendighetens navn (1976), with Ole Paus
Everything Happens to Me (1977), with Bjarne Nerem
Til jorden (1978), with Rolf Jacobsen
Live fra ABC-teatret (1979), with Odd Børretzen & Alf Cranner
Live at Jazz Alive (1983), with Thorgeir Stubø
Sofies plass (1983), with Magni Wentzel
All or Nothing at All (1985), with Magni Wentzel
My Wonderful One (1987/88)
Dedications (1985), with Per Husby
I Hear a Rhapsody (1985), with Totti Bergh
Major Blues (1990), with Totti Bergh
Time for Love (1986), with Laila Dalseth
A Woman's Intuition (1995), with Laila Dalseth
Den dagen Lady døde (1986), with Jan Erik Vold
Blåmann! Blåmann! (1988), with Jan Erik Vold
Sannheten om trikken er at den brenner (1990), with Jan Erik Vold
Pytt pytt blues (1992), with Jan Erik Vold
Obstfelder Live på Rebekka West (1993), with Jan Erik Vold
Her er huset som Per bygde (1996), with Jan Erik Vold
Storytellers (1998), with Jan Erik Vold
Constellations (1990), with Bjørn Alterhaug
Three Shades of Blue (1995), with Staffan William-Olsson
Oslo Jazz Circle – Jubileumskonsert (1998), with various artists
Round Chet's Midnight (1999), with Hilde Hefte
Playsong (2001), with Hilde Hefte
First Song (2000), with Bodil Niska
Violin (2000), with Ola Kvernberg
Playsong - the music of Bill Evans (2001), with Hilde Hefte
Bjørn Johansen in Memoriam (2003)
The Next Step with Jon Larsen (2003)
Blue with Bodil Niska (2003)
Hildes BossaHefte with Hilde Hefte (2003)
Den dagen Lady døde with Jan Erik Vold (2003)
Core Business with Louis Stewart (2004)
Jargong Vålereng''' with Rolf Søder (2004)On The Corner with Hilde Hefte (2006)AN EVENING IN PRAGUE with Hilde Hefte & The City of Prague Philharmonic Orchestra (2007)Drømmemakeren sa with Jan Erik Vold (2008)Short Stories with Hilde Hefte (2013)Quiet Dreams'' with Hilde Hefte (2017)

References

External links 

Norsk Jazzarkivs nettsider

1940 births
2017 deaths
20th-century Norwegian pianists
21st-century Norwegian pianists
Norwegian jazz pianists
Norwegian jazz composers
Male jazz composers
Gemini Records artists
Hot Club Records artists
Ponca Jazz Records artists
Spellemannprisen winners
Musicians from Oslo
Norwegian male pianists
20th-century Norwegian male musicians
21st-century Norwegian male musicians